Kirdar (from , "deed") may refer to:

 Birkan Kirdar (born 2002), Australian association football player
 Gökhan Kırdar (born 1970), Turkish musician
 Gözde Kırdar (born 1985), Turkish female volleyballer
 Nemir Kirdar, Iraqi businessman 
 Özge Kırdar (born 1985), Turkish female volleyballer
 Rena Kirdar Sindi, Iraqi author
 Üner Kirdar, Turkish author and United Nations official

Arabic-language surnames
Turkish-language surnames